Bere Ferrers, sometimes called Beerferris, is a village and civil parish on the Bere peninsula in West Devon in the English county of Devon.  It is located to the north of Plymouth, on the west bank of the River Tavy. It has a railway station on the Tamar Valley Line.

The civil parish includes the whole of the Bere peninsula, including the village of Bere Alston and the smaller settlements of Tuckermarsh, Rumleigh, Buttspill, Braunder, Cotts, Hewton, Weir Quay, Clamoak, Gnatham and Collytown. In 2001 the parish had a population of 3,066; this had decreased to 2,989 in 2011.

Parish church

Sources
Rogers, W.H. Hamilton, The Strife of the Roses and Days of the Tudors in the West, Exeter, 1890, pp. 1–36, Willoughby de Broke

See also
 Bere Ferrers rail accident
 Exeter to Plymouth railway of the LSWR

References

External links 

1999 Parish appraisal
GENUKI page

 
Villages in the Borough of West Devon